Ernest "Ernie" Hall (16 September 1929 – 25 January 1987) was an English-born merchant and political figure in British Columbia. He represented Surrey in the Legislative Assembly of British Columbia from 1966 to 1975 and from 1979 to 1983 as a New Democratic Party (NDP) member.

He was born in Manchester and worked briefly as a teacher before joining the British Army. Hall came to Canada in 1957 and worked as a textile wholesaler. He later worked for the Hudson's Bay Company wholesale division. In 1963, he was named provincial secretary for the NDP in British Columbia. He lived in Surrey. Hall was defeated when he ran for reelection to the provincial assembly in 1975, when he lost to Bill Vander Zalm, and in 1983. He served in the provincial cabinet as Provincial Secretary. In 1974, Hall introduced a bill to establish British Columbia Day as a public holiday in the province.

He was 57 when he died of a heart attack in 1987.

References 

1929 births
1987 deaths
British Columbia New Democratic Party MLAs
Businesspeople in textiles
Canadian schoolteachers
English emigrants to Canada
Hudson's Bay Company people
Members of the Executive Council of British Columbia
People from Stretford
20th-century British Army personnel
20th-century Canadian politicians